Deo Nang Toï (1914–2008) was the daughter of Deo Van Long, the president of the Fédération Taï in North-West Vietnam and Laos under the last years of French Indochina. Following his death in Toulouse in 1975, she assumed his title among the Tai exile community.

References

1914 births
2008 deaths
Vietnamese royalty